Chapter III is third album released by American band Allure in 2004.

Track listing
 Intro - 1:06    
 Hate 2 Luv U (Erika Nuri) - 3:40    
 Relax and Unwind (Chris Stewart) - 4:03    
 Let Em Go (Alia Davis/Lalisha McLean/Akissa Mendez) - 3:56    
 Long Lost Love (featuring Braska) (Alia Davis/Lalisha McLean/Akissa Mendez) - 4:32    
 I Think I'm in Love (Alia Davis/Lalisha McLean/Akissa Mendez) - 4:12    
 Sitting at Home (Alia Davis/Lalisha McLean/Akissa Mendez) - 3:24    
 Bitter Sweet (Maine Laughton/Alia Davis/Lalisha McLean/Akissa Mendez) - 4:17    
 Can't Stay Here with You (Jeff Germain/Alia Davis/Lalisha McLean/Akissa Mendez) - 3:59   
 Uh Oh (Leaving with Me) [featuring Elephant Man] (Nwosobi Obi/Ainsworth Prasad/Tanya White Aka Freckles) - 3:45    
 Watch Ya (Dorian Hardnett/Chris Stewart) - 3:42    
 Frustration (Dorian Hardnett/Chris Stewart) - 4:19    
 Gospel Interlude - 1:23    
 Stay (Alia Davis/Lalisha McLean/Akissa Mendez) - 5:02    
 I Think I'm in Love (Remix) [featuring Joe Budden] (Alia Davis/Lalisha McLean/Akissa Mendez) - 4:52    
 I Feel So - 3:33

Bonus tracks
You Are the Man [UK Bonus Track]
Hate 2 Luv U [Remix]

Singles
Uh Oh
I Think I'm in Love
Frustration (US Radio Only)
Hate 2 Luv U (Europe Only)

2004 albums
Allure (band) albums